The 3 arrondissements of the Côte-d'Or department are:
 Arrondissement of Beaune, (subprefecture: Beaune) with 222 communes. The population of the arrondissement was 111,295 in 2016.  
 Arrondissement of Dijon, (prefecture of the Côte-d'Or department: Dijon) with 224 communes. The population of the arrondissement was 361,844 in 2016.  
 Arrondissement of Montbard, (subprefecture: Montbard) with 252 communes. The population of the arrondissement was 60,074 in 2016.

History

In 1800 the arrondissements of Dijon, Beaune, Châtillon-sur-Seine and Semur-en-Auxois were established. In 1926 the arrondissement of Châtillon-sur-Seine was disbanded, and Montbard replaced Semur-en-Auxois as subprefecture. In January 2017 31 communes that were previously part of the arrondissement of Dijon were assigned to the arrondissement of Beaune.

References

Cote-d'Or